Tsukamurella tyrosinosolvens is a Gram-positive and aerobic bacterium from the genus Tsukamurella. Tsukamurella tyrosinosolvens bacteria can cause in rare cases infections in humans.

References

Further reading

External links
Type strain of Tsukamurella tyrosinosolvens at BacDive -  the Bacterial Diversity Metadatabase

Mycobacteriales
Bacteria described in 1997